Tour the World is an Australian travel and infotainment television series that aired for three seasons on Network Ten, One, 4ME and Foxtel Aurora.

Tour the World accompanied Australian tour groups to destinations around the world and filmed the experience for the production of the show. Each episode featured a single destination and showcased transport, accommodation, cultural activities, food, history, shopping options and relaxation activities. The tour participants also share their experiences with viewers.

Tour the World was written and hosted by Adam Ford and co-hosted by Jade Harrison, Robbie Tall and Julia Vogl. No further series are planned at this stage.

Episode list:

Series one
Britain & Ireland Explorer
Splendours of Europe River Cruise
Kakadu & Kimberley Explorer
Tasmanian Spectacular
New Zealand Southern Spectacular

Series two
Vietnam at a Glance
Southern Africa & Victoria Falls Part 1
Southern Africa & Victoria Falls Part 2
New Zealand North Island Unveiled
Rockies Grandeur
Capitals & Eastern Canada

Series three
The Best of South America Part 1
The Best of South America Part 2
India's Golden Triangle
Aussie Touring Special
Complete Eastern USA Part 1
Complete Eastern USA Part 2

Network 10 original programming
Australian travel television series
2014 Australian television series debuts
English-language television shows